Amaxia flavipuncta is a moth of the family Erebidae found in Brazil. It was described by George Hampson in 1903.

References

Moths described in 1903
Amaxia
Moths of South America